Holiline Reminder is a free software calendar program for Windows.

Holiline Reminder is characterized by very small space and memory requirements, stability, and an easily customizable user-interface. Holiline Reminder places birthday countdowns, special holidays, and upcoming weddings in a creeping line banner that will stay at the top or bottom of a desktop. It has common functions such as a to-do list and a calendar and unique functions such as a creeping line and adjusting colors to a desktop.

Different event types have a different set of displayed field and a different text of a notification. Each event type can be supplemented with a photo which is displayed in a tooltip. Calendars can also be imported using widespread iCal files.

Holiline Reminder is available as of 2012 in 16 languages.

Alternatives to Holiline Reminder include Google Calendar, Rainlendar and DeskTask.

References

External links
 
 View Reminders on Windows Taskbar
 Holiline provides a very handy means of staying on top of important events.

Calendaring software